Solstice Sunglasses (also known as Solstice Sunglass Boutique or simply Solstice) is a retailer of sunglasses and sunglass accessories founded in Secaucus, New Jersey in 2002.

In 2002, Safilo acquired Solstice with plans to expand the chain.

On May 23, 2019, Safilo sold Solstice to Fairway LLC for $9 million.

On February 18, 2021, Solstice, amongst its retail operator, Solstice Marketing Concepts, LLC, filed for Chapter 11 bankruptcy in the United States. During the filing, it had plans to shutter some of its retail footprint.

On August 5, 2021, Solstice emerged from bankruptcy, stating that they are a "leaner, more efficient operation" after coming out of bankruptcy.

References

External links
 Official website

Eyewear retailers of the United States
American companies established in 2002
Retail companies established in 2002
2002 mergers and acquisitions
2019 mergers and acquisitions
Companies that filed for Chapter 11 bankruptcy in 2021